Wier may refer to:

Wier, Netherlands, a small village in the Netherlands
Wier (name), a surname (including a list of people with the name)
Wier Longleaf Lumber Company, established in 1917 by Robert W. Wier

See also
 Wier-Cook Airport in Indianapolis, Indiana, United States
 Wiergate, Newton County, Texas, site of Wier Longleaf Lumber Company
 Bon Wier, Newton County, Texas, site of Wier Longleaf Lumber Company
 Weir, a small overflow-type dam
 Weir (disambiguation)